Octav Băncilă (4 February 1872 – 3 April 1944) was a Romanian realist painter and left-wing activist. He was the brother of Sofia Nădejde, a feminist journalist, and the brother-in-law of Ioan Nădejde (an atheist and socialist thinker, editor of the magazine Contemporanul).

Biography
Born in Botoşani, he remained an orphan at age 4, and was raised in Iaşi by his much older sister and her husband, who first encouraged Octav's talent and passion for art. After completing primary school, he entered the Fine Arts School in Iaşi, where he was taught by Gheorghe Panaiteanu Bardasare, Constantin Daniel Stahi, and Emanoil Bardasare, graduating in 1893. Between 1894 and 1897, he lived and studied abroad on a scholarship: first in Italy and France, and finally in Germany, where he studied under Nicholaos Gysis at the Akademie der Bildenden Künste in Munich (it is not known whether he ever graduated).

Upon his return, he attempted to open a studio in downtown Iaşi, but financial constraints forced him to settle on the outskirts; it was during that time that Băncilă began exploring his major themes: the lives of peasants, factory workers, impoverished Jewish traders and artisans, conscripted soldiers, and of nomadic Roma people. After 1901, he taught calligraphy and art in primary schools in the city. Impressed by the outcome of the 1905 Revolution in the Russian Empire, he was soon active in socialist circles, and became an acquaintance of major intellectual figures on the Left, including Gala Galaction and Paul Bujor.

In 1907, following the crushing of the Romanian Peasants' Revolt, Băncilă began traveling the country and attempting to gather evidence of government repression and violence. The result was a series of twelve paintings (not all of them surviving), including his famous figure of an old peasant standing open-armed (titled Înainte de 1907, "Before 1907"), several images of dead bodies piled up in fields (being looked on by soldiers), and the eponymous 1907, depicting three ragged peasants running into rifle fire.

Following the outbreak of World War I, he became involved in pacifist causes, using his work to comment on the results of conflict. In 1916, he was appointed professor at the Fine Arts School in Iaşi (a position he kept until his retirement in 1937). With Constantin Ion Parhon and Bujor, Băncilă founded, in 1919, the short-lived Laborer Party (Partidul Muncitor), soon fused into the Peasants' Party.

He remained critical of social and political developments inside Greater Romania, was supportive of strike actions in the Jiu Valley, and used his art to attack anti-Semitic trends in Romanian society. Towards the end of his life, he began to sympathise with communism (he was not, however, affiliated with the Communist Party of Romania).

Notes

References
Maria Epure, Octav Băncilă, Editura de Stat pentru Literatură şi Artă, Bucharest, 1956
Victor Frunză, Istoria stalinismului în România ("The History of Stalinism in Romania"), Humanitas, Bucharest, 1990
Vasile Niculae, Ion Ilincioiu, Stelian Neagoe, Doctrina ţărănistă în România. Antologie de texte ("Peasant Doctrine in Romania. Collected Texts"), Editura Noua Alternativă, Social Theory Institute of the Romanian Academy, Bucharest, 1994

Gallery

External links

Short biography

20th-century Romanian painters
Realist painters
Academic staff of the George Enescu National University of Arts
Romanian activists
Poporanists
Romanian communists
Romanian pacifists
Romanian schoolteachers
People from Botoșani
Academy of Fine Arts, Munich alumni
1872 births
1944 deaths